K. Cheemaichamy is an Indian politician and former Member of the Legislative Assembly of Tamil Nadu state in India. He was elected to the Tamil Nadu legislative assembly as a Swatantra Party candidate from Manamadurai constituency in 1962 and 1967 elections.

References 

Tamil Nadu politicians
Possibly living people
Year of birth missing
Swatantra Party politicians
20th-century Indian politicians